Zambrano is a surname of Spanish and also Basque origin.  Members of this family have played a prominent role through the history of Spain and The Americas.

Etymology
Zambrana or Zambrano comes from the word soberano ("sovereign")..

Origins
The Zambrano family originated in the mountains of Biscay.  Piferrer records that the first to bear this name was Fortun Sanchez.

Francisco Zazo y Rosillo, the Chronicler King of Arms to Philip V of Spain, chronicled the lineage of the Zambrano family from its origins in the village of Zambrana in the Gipuzkoa province in what was at the time the Kingdom of Castile.  This Castilian origin is reflected in the Zambrano family crest, which features the castle sigil of Castile along with the rose sigil of Reus.  The progenitor of this line was Ochoa de Zambraos, who served as a knight to the Catholic Monarchs.  Zazo proceeds to trace the lineage through five generations (and the eventual evolution of the name from Zambraos to Zambrano), noting the spread of the family to Flanders, Úbeda, Málaga, Antequera and La Rioja, and the service of the family to Philip I of Castile, Charles V of Flanders and Philip II of Spain.

The village of Zambrana was named for the Zambrano family, who were granted a land grant there by Don Sancho in 1058.

The Estado Militar de España was an annual register of the status of military affairs of Spain, including the listing of special orders of military honor, including the Order of Santiago, the Order of Calatrava, the Order of Alcantara and the Order of Montesa.  The Zambrano name can be found frequently among these registers.

Notable Zambranos

Notable people with this surname include:
 Alejandro Zambrano (born 1991), Spanish football midfielder
 Alonso de Llera Zambrano ( 1610–1639), Spanish painter, active during Baroque period
 Aura Zambrano (born January 1981), Venezuelan beauty pageant winner
 Benito Zambrano (born 1965), Spanish screenwriter and film director
 Carlos Zambrano (disambiguation), multiple uses, including:
Carlos Zambrano (born 1981), Venezuelan baseball pitcher
Carlos Zambrano (boxer) (born 1984), Peruvian boxer
Carlos Zambrano (footballer) (born 1989), Peruvian football midfielder
 Cesar Zambrano (born 1984), American soccer midfielder
 David De La Mora Zambrano (born 1989), Mexican bantamweight boxer 
 Edgar Zambrano (born 1955), Venezuelan politician
 Eduardo Zambrano (born 1966), Venezuelan baseball right fielder and first baseman
 Fernando Zambrano (born 1949), Spanish footballer
 Henry Zambrano (born 1973), Colombian footballer
 Hjalmar Zambrano (born 1971), Ecuadorian footballer
 Hodei Zambrano (born 1987), basque video producer
 Jesús Zambrano (born 1989), Venezuelan model and actor
 Jimmy Zambrano (born 1968), Colombian accordionist and multi-instrumentalist
 Juan José, Conde de Zambrano, (1750-1816) mine owner of Durango, Mexico, and builder of Palacio de Zambrano
 Josmar Zambrano (born 1992), Venezuelan footballer
 Juan Gabriel Concepción Zambrano (born 1972), Spanish track and field athlete
 Lorenzo Zambrano (1945–2014), Mexican business executive and philanthropist
 Manolo Zambrano (born 1960), Spanish football midfielder, and manager
 María Zambrano (1904–1991), Spanish essayist, philosopher and academic
 Mateo de Toro Zambrano, 1st Count of La Conquista (1727–1811), Spanish military leader in Colonial Chile
 Merly Zambrano (born 1981), Ecuadorian footballer 
 Miguel Zambrano (born 1951), Peruvian wrestler 
 Octavio Zambrano (born 1958), Ecuadorian football (soccer) coach
 Raúl Zambrano (born 1969), Mexican guitarist
 Renzo Zambrano (born 1994), Venezuelan footballer 
 Richard Zambrano (born 1967), Chilean footballer
 Roddy Zambrano (born 1978), Ecuadorian professional football referee
 Víctor Zambrano (born 1975), Venezuelan baseball player
 Vicente Paúl Ambrosi Zambrano (born 1980), Ecuadorian footballer
 Yamila Zambrano (born 1986), Cuban judoka 
 Jimmy Zambrano Ramírez (born 1979), Ecuadorian educational researcher

Fictional characters
 Kim Zambrano, Fire Department of New York paramedic, played by Kim Raver, on American television series Third Watch, seen on NBC from 1999 to 2005; she appeared in first five seasons, first episode of season six, and cameo in May 6, 2005 finale
 The Zambrano crime family in Venezuela, from J.J. Connolly's Viva La Madness

References

Spanish-language surnames
Basque-language surnames